SOMOSTV LLC, is an American Pay TV entertainment company engaged in the production, distribution, and marketing of Pay TV channels in the U.S. Hispanic market, Puerto Rico, Mexico, Panama, Central America, and the Caribbean. Headquartered in Miami, Florida, the company owns and operates two networks: ViendoMovies and Semillitas. SOMOSTV is headed by Luis Villanueva, an executive in the Hispanic media and entertainment industry, President and CEO of SOMOS Group.

History
SOMOSTV started operations in 2006 with the launch of ViendoMovies, a 24-hour movie channel which features exclusive, theatrical wide release, commercial-free movies (feature films) produced in Spanish. ViendoMovies, has distribution agreements with all major cable television, telcos, and satellite television  distribution companies in the United States and Puerto Rico. ViendoMovies programing is a mix of feature film genres from Spain and Latin America, packaged with promotional material targeting the U.S. Hispanic Market including coverage of Film Festivals .In 2010, SomosTV expanded its services with the launch of its second channel, “Semillitas. “Semillitas” is an animation] network oriented to Hispanic toddlers and pre-teens and preschool aged children with the objective to entertain and helping preserve the language and cultural heritage.[3]. From its  initial launch in the United States and Puerto Rico, “Semillitas” expanded internationally, being distributed today in Central America, Mexico and the Caribbean.

Television Content
The company is considered an aggregator or bundler of licensed content but it often produces and edits content in-house.

SOMOSTV has developed, manages and distributes two television networks, “ViendoMovies” and “Semillitas".[12] Luis Villanueva also oversees Somos Distribution LLC (an independent distributor of audiovisual programming worldwide), SOMOS Productions LLC (an independent programming producer) and SOMOS Films (production of feature films, together known as SOMOS Group. In 2014 Luis Villanueva also launched SOMOS Next LLC, an Internet "OTT" (Over-the-top media service) content distributor, with a catalog of films under the brand FlixLatino  (for the US and Puerto Rico) and children's animation under the brand "Pingüinitos" (for Mexico, Central America and The Caribbean).[13]

References

External links
http://www.somostv.net

Mass media companies of the United States
Spanish-language television networks
Spanish-language television networks in the United_States
Companies based in Miami-Dade County, Florida
Television channels and stations established in 2006